The Michael J. Fox Foundation for Parkinson's Research is dedicated to finding a cure for Parkinson's disease (PD) established in 2000 by Michael J. Fox. It concentrates on funding research and ensuring the development of improved therapies for people with Parkinson's.

History 
Established in 2000 by Canadian actor Michael J. Fox, the foundation has since become the largest non-profit funder of Parkinson's disease research in the world, with more  than $1 billion of research projects to date. In 2010, the Foundation launched the first large-scale clinical study on evolution biomarkers of the disease at a cost of $45 million over five years.

Research funding
The Foundation works towards "translational" research—the work of translating basic scientific discoveries into simple treatments with definition to benefit the estimated five million people living with Parkinson's disease today.

The Foundation  drives progress by awarding grants to ensure that the most promising research avenues are thoroughly funded, explored and carried forward toward pharmacy shelves. The Foundation's four annually recurring Pipeline Programs aim to speed research along the drug development pipeline. The Pipeline Programs include:

Rapid Response Innovation Awards quickly support high-risk, high-reward projects with little to no existing preliminary data, but potential to significantly impact our understanding or treatment of PD (an Edmond J. Safra Core Program for PD Research).

Target Validation Awards provide support for work demonstrating whether modulation of a novel biological target has impact in a PD-relevant pre-clinical model — an essential step to the development of potential targeted therapies (an Edmond J. Safra Core Program for PD Research).

Clinical Intervention Awards support clinical testing of promising PD therapies that may significantly and fundamentally improve treatment of PD (an Edmond J. Safra Core Program for PD Research).

Therapeutics Development Initiative, an industry-exclusive support program for preclinical development of Parkinson's disease therapies with potential to fundamentally alter disease course and/or improve treatment of symptoms above and beyond current standards of care.

The Pipeline Programs are complemented by the Foundation's Critical Challenges in Parkinson's Disease program, which provides funds for top research priorities. Critical Challenges in 2009/2010 include: speeding research on PD genetic targets, LRRK2 and alpha-synuclein; advancing research on neurotrophic factors; identifying biomarkers of PD; understanding patient's unmet needs, like postural instability and gait disturbances; and, promoting collaborations with the Arizona Parkinson's Disease Consortium.

Community and matchmaking

 Team Fox for Parkinson's Research is the foundation's grassroots community project raising funds and awareness for Parkinson's disease.
 The organization hosts the Fox Trial Finder, which is a website for presenting clinical trials in Parkinson's disease clinical research.

Education and awareness
The Michael J. Fox Foundation publishes a print newsletter The Fox Focus two times per year as well as a monthly e-newsletter, FoxFlash, to keep supporters updated on Parkinson's research progress. In 2010, the Foundation launched an audio podcast series on Parkinson's science, hosted by KQED Public Radio Host David Iverson. Living with Parkinson's is the Foundation's online source for information on PD (including an animation about how the brain is affected by Parkinson's), guides for the newly diagnosed and caregivers, stories from people living with the disease and additional resources.

In 2016, it created a raffle to raise awareness for Parkinson's disease and raised $6.75 million through Nike and two auctions in foreign cities such as Hong Kong and London. One of the Nike Mags sold for over $200,000.

References

External links
 

Biomedical research foundations
Medical and health foundations in the United States
Non-profit organizations based in New York City
Organizations established in 2000
Parkinson's disease
Michael J. Fox